Marina Medvin is an American criminal defense attorney located in Alexandria, Virginia. She is also a senior columnist at Townhall, a former contributor at Forbes, and provides legal analysis to news outlets.

Education and career 
Medvin is a graduate of Pennsylvania State University (B.S., Information Sciences and Technology). She received her Juris Doctor from the Antonin Scalia Law School at George Mason University. She is licensed to practice state law in Virginia, the District of Columbia, and Texas; as well as federal law in most federal courts in Virginia, DC, and Texas. Medvin has been recognized by the Washingtonian as being one of Washington DC's Best Lawyers.

January 6 Capitol Cases 
Medvin is representing at least ten known individuals charged in the 2021 storming of the United States Capitol.

Medvin's client Jenny Cudd was granted a Mexican getaway during her pre-trial release. In Cudd's case, Medvin argued the District of Columbia was too partisan to have a fair jury and asked to move the case from DC to Texas. Medvin was the first lawyer representing a Capitol defendant to move for the trial to be relocated to another jurisdiction, though others later copied Medvin's brief and made identical arguments. At sentencing for Jenny Cudd, Medvin argued that Cudd's charges should be dismissed or that she should be sentenced to a fine, citing disparate treatment of the Kavanaugh, Portland, and Seattle protestors, where criminal charges were dismissed. Judge Trevor McFadden agreed and sentenced Jenny Cudd to a fine and two months of probation. Medvin then argued with the Government over whether Cudd should be permitted to possess her firearms during probation and prevailed.

In another Capitol breach case, Medvin represented a 61-year-old alleged Capitol rioter charged with assaulting Capitol Police officers, who she claimed would be proven innocent once a government released a video showing John Anderson did not commit the alleged acts. Court records show Medvin berating the government's control of information about the January 6 defendants: "This is not the Soviet Union, and the government does not get to control the narrative of what happens in the courtroom. The weedlike growth of the government's power over public information is outrageous and un-American and cannot be permitted to continue unchecked." Anderson passed away in September 2021 before his trial. Medvin later explained that Anderson never entered the Capitol on his own, having been brought inside for medical care, and that he never hurt or impeded any officers, contrary to the government's accusations. Medvin appeared on Sebastian Gorka's show in April 2022 and stated that Anderson was brought into the Capitol building by Capitol police who rendered medical aid to Anderson after he experienced a medical emergency when he was gassed by a malicious actor in the crowd behind him. Anderson repeatedly said, "I can't breathe, I can't breathe." The man who emptied a gas canister into Anderson was never charged, according to Medvin.

In October of 2022, Medvin was able to secure "a rare win among defense motions to dismiss charges [in Capitol Breach cases]" for her client Mark Ibrahim, a former DEA agent who was charged with three felonies and a misdemeanor for his participation in the January 6 protest.

Medvin is also representing two US Marines charged for their participation in the January 6 incident, one an alleged Proud Boys member. Her client Christopher Warnagiris, the only active-duty servicemember charged for January 6 participation, pleaded not guilty to assaulting or interfering with a Capitol police officer. Warnagiris, like Medvin's client Jenny Cudd, also received permission from the court to continue possessing his firearms.

Medvin's Prior Cases of Note 
Medvin previously represented an FBI 10 Most Wanted fugitive, a hacktivist in the Anonymous Operation Payback case, and a student who hacked CIA Director John Brennan and published with WikiLeaks. Medvin also secured the dismissal of criminal charges for Harry Jackson, a local Virginia politician and father who was facing four misdemeanor charges for statements made on YouTube and on Twitter that accused an activist of "grooming behavior" around children.

Early life and political views 
Marina Medvin emigrated from the USSR in 1992. She has publicly discussed her childhood observations between Soviet socialism and U.S. capitalism, being quoted as saying "The best argument against socialism? Me." Politico described Medvin as a "conservative firebrand."

References

External links 
 

Living people
Criminal defense lawyers
American women columnists
American columnists
American social commentators
Lawyers from Alexandria, Virginia
Pennsylvania State University alumni
George Mason University alumni
Year of birth missing (living people)
21st-century American women